Gabriele Cioffi (born 7 September 1975) is an Italian professional football manager and former player who played as a defender. He was most recently head coach of Serie A club Hellas Verona.

Playing career
As a player, Cioffi was a defender. He started his career with Tuscan amateurs Sestese, which was followed by several other experience in the minor Italian leagues of Serie C1 and Serie C2. In January 2005 he joined Mantova, with whom he became a fan favourite, won a Serie C1 title and made his Serie B debut during the 2005–06 season. After an impressive Serie B campaign with Mantova, he was subsequently signed by Torino, with whom he made his Serie A debut during the 2006–07 season.

He left Torino after one season to join Ascoli, which he left in 2010 for AlbinoLeffe as a free agent. He retired in 2012 after two seasons with Carpi where he won the league as captain getting the promotion from Lega Pro 2 to Lega Pro 1. In his last season with the club, he lost the final for promotion to Serie B.

Managerial career

Early years
After his retirement, he stayed in Carpi as an assistant coach for the 2012–13 season. In July 2013 he was announced as new head coach of Lega Pro Seconda Divisione club Gavorrano; he was fired later in November and following his departure the squad had a poor run of results.  It was widely understood that the club called him back with a few games remaining in the season, and relegation being a formality, although Gabriele refused to return.

He subsequently relocated to Australia and worked for two years as youth coaches former for Eastern United FC, before moving back to Italy in November 2015 to accept an offer as youth coach for the Berretti team of third division club Südtirol. He left the club in February 2016 to join Henk Ten Cate's coaching staff as assistant head coach at Al Jazira Club.

After being an integral part of leading Al-Jazira to the President's Cup in 2016, and steering the club into returning to the Asian Champions League, Gabriele was headhunted in December 2016 and he joined the coaching staff of Gianfranco Zola at English Championship club Birmingham City. Following Zola's resignations on 17 April 2017, his entire backroom staff, including Cioffi, left Birmingham too.

In October 2017 he signed as assistant manager for Al Dhafra Football club who was fighting relegation.  His first match on the touchline was against his previous team, Al-Jazira. The team, thanks to his work, was able to achieve safety from relegation, and to have a stable position in the table.

Crawley Town
He had been widely accredited as being instrumental as assistant at his previous clubs, and having been earmarked and interviewed for several clubs after leaving Al-Dhafra, the opportunity finally arose for him to take on a role as head coach. In September 2018 he was named as new head coach of EFL League Two club Crawley Town who was fighting the relegation area, succeeding Harry Kewell.

Cioffi achieved the objective laid out for him comfortably, saving the club from relegation with several games of the season left, and was confirmed for a second season, during which Cioffi taking took on two historic cup runs, the first being the club reaching the 4th round of the League Cup for the first time, and beating Premier League opposition for the first time in the process, as well as reaching the 2nd round of the FA Cup for the first time in nearly a decade. Several unfortunate injuries to key players, at the same time, led to a run where the club struggled to score and win despite creating chances. Gabriele was routinely supported by his players after the loss to League One team Fleetwood Town in the FA Cup, but despite this Cioffi and Crawley Town parted ways by mutual consent shortly thereafter. He was succeeded by John Yems.

Udinese
In September 2020, he joined Serie A club Udinese as an assistant coach to manager Luca Gotti.  Cioffi settled in quickly at Udinese and when Luca Gotti was beset with COVID-19, Gabriele was in interim charge, including a famous away victory at Lazio. Although some media outlets strongly credited him with the plan for the victory, Gabriele humbly deferred to, and dedicated the victory to his boss.
On 7 December 2021, following Luca Gotti's sacking at Udinese, Cioffi became the caretaker head coach for the team. Under his tenure, Cioffi managed to guide Udinese out of the relegation zone, ending the season in twelfth place with 47 points; despite this, on 23 May 2022, one day after the final matchday of the season (a 4–0 away win at Salernitana), Udinese announced they will not extend Cioffi's contract with the club, due to expire on 30 June 2022.

Hellas Verona
In June 2022, Cioffi signed as manager for Serie A club Hellas Verona with a contract lasting until 2024. On 11 October 2022, Cioffi was dismissed from his job after achieving only five points in the first nine games of the Serie A season.

Managerial statistics

References

External links
 Cioffi's profile from Gazetta dello Sport

1975 births
Living people
Footballers from Florence
Italian footballers
Association football defenders
Spezia Calcio players
Taranto F.C. 1927 players
Mantova 1911 players
Torino F.C. players
Ascoli Calcio 1898 F.C. players
U.C. AlbinoLeffe players
A.C. Carpi players
Serie A players
Serie B players
Serie C players
Italian football managers
Crawley Town F.C. managers
English Football League managers
Italian expatriate footballers
Expatriate football managers in England
Italian expatriate football managers
Birmingham City F.C. non-playing staff
Udinese Calcio managers
Hellas Verona F.C. managers
Serie A managers